Borith Lake is a lake in Gojal, Hunza Valley in Gilgit–Baltistan, Pakistan.

Geography 
Borith lake lies approximately 2 km to the north of Hussaini, a saline body of water occupying a small hollow at an elevation of 2,500 meters (8,200 feet). The lake can be reached via a 2 km unpaved jeep route from Husseini village, which lies adjacent to Gulmit village. It is also accessible by a 2-3 hour trekking route directly from Gulmit, across the end of the Ghulkin glacier. The site is a sanctuary for migrating wildfowl and is often visited by bird-watchers and nature lovers. To witness the large number of ducks arriving from the warmer parts of southern Pakistan, one should visit between the months of March and June. The birds rest here on their way northwards to the cooler waters of central Asia. Similarly, from September–November, the event occurs in reverse with the onset of winter towards the north.

A short trek of one hour each way brings visitors to Hussaini Glacier. Hikers can follow the trekking route towards Borith Lake as far as the edge of the glacier, and return by the same route.

A longer walk to Passu Gar Glacier is another attraction, crossing both Ghulkin Glacier and Borith Lake. Having crossed Hussaini Glacier by the same route, hikers can continue on the southern side of Borith Lake past the settlement of Borith Bala and the now deserted settlement of Shahabad. The lack of a continuous water supply led to the desertification of this village many years ago. The walk takes about 4–5 hours form Ghulkin to Passu. From the glacier, a path leads down to the Karakorum Highway and the Shisper Hotel.

See also 
Attabad Lake
Hunza Valley

References

External links 
Gulkin Glacier and Borith Lake info
 Northern Pakistan detailed placemarks in Google Earth

Lakes of Pakistan
Lakes of Gilgit-Baltistan